The Gau Düsseldorf was an administrative division of Nazi Germany from 1933 to 1945 in the Düsseldorf region of the Prussian Rhine Province. Before that, from 1930 to 1933, it was the regional subdivision of the Nazi Party in that area.

History
The Nazi Gau (plural Gaue) system was originally established in a party conference on 22 May 1926, in order to improve administration of the party structure. From 1933 onward, after the Nazi seizure of power, the Gaue increasingly replaced the German states as administrative subdivisions in Germany. The region had originally belonged to the Gau Ruhr, initially led by Joseph Goebbels, became part of the Gau Westphalia in 1928 before becoming its own Gau in August 1930.

At the head of each Gau stood a Gauleiter, a position which became increasingly more powerful, especially after the outbreak of the Second World War, with little interference from above. Local Gauleiters often held government positions as well as party ones and were in charge of, among other things, propaganda and surveillance and, from September 1944 onward, the Volkssturm and the defense of the Gau.

The position of Gauleiter in Düsseldorf was held by Friedrich Karl Florian throughout the history of the Gau from 1930 to 1945. Florian was sentenced to six years in prison after the war because of his rank in the Nazi Party and released in 1951. He remained a convinced Nazi after the war and maintained contact to former associates from the Nazi era.

The Gau had a size of 2,700 km2 (2,741 sq mi) and a population of 2,200,000, which placed it in mid-table for size and population in the list of Gaue.

References

External links
 Illustrated list of Gauleiter

1930 establishments in Germany
1945 disestablishments in Germany
History of Düsseldorf
Rhine Province under Nazi rule